Juha Tella (born 9 October 1960) is a Finnish biathlete. He competed in the 20 km individual event at the 1988 Winter Olympics.

References

External links
 

1960 births
Living people
Finnish male biathletes
Olympic biathletes of Finland
Biathletes at the 1988 Winter Olympics
People from Ruokolahti
Sportspeople from South Karelia